Sara Field (born April 28, 1969) is an American rower. In the 1996 World Rowing Championships, she won a gold medal in the women's coxless four event.

References

External links

1969 births
American female rowers
World Rowing Championships medalists for the United States
Living people
21st-century American women
Place of birth missing (living people)